Diwancheruvu is a part of Greater Rajamahendravaram Municipal Corporation (GRMC). It is a one popular locality in Rajamahendravaram City.

Geography
This area is heart of Rajamahendravaram City.

Locality info
Diwancheruvu locality is 2nd and 4th wards of Greater Rajamahendravaram Municipal Corporation (GRMC).

References 

Villages in East Godavari district